State Road 163 in the U.S. State of Indiana is a short  route in Vermillion and Parke counties.  Though it is an odd-numbered route, it is an east–west route.

Route description
State Road 163 travels from the Illinois border in the town of Blanford and proceeds east through Centenary.  It then crosses State Road 63 and proceeds into Clinton where it follows several streets on its way through the middle of town:  Western Avenue, 9th street, Elm Street, Main Street, and Walnut Street.  It then crosses the Wabash River at the east edge of town and joins U.S. Route 41 about a mile east of the river.

Major intersections

References

External links

163
Transportation in Vermillion County, Indiana
Transportation in Parke County, Indiana